Sonia Maccioni (born 5 March 1966) is an Italian female retired marathon runner, which participated at the 1997 World Championships in Athletics.

Biography
She won an edition of Venice Marathon in 1999.

Achievements

References

External links
 

1966 births
Living people
Italian female marathon runners
World Athletics Championships athletes for Italy
20th-century Italian women
21st-century Italian women